Henry Kendall AFC, (28 May 1897 – 9 June 1962) was an English stage and film actor, theatre director and revue artiste.

His early theatrical career was curtailed by the First World War, in which he served with distinction. Resuming his stage career in 1919 he appeared mostly in the West End, with one excursion to Broadway and occasional tours of the British provinces, particularly during the Second World War. He was dismissive of his career as a screen actor, but made more than 40 films for the cinema. As a theatre director he was responsible for more than 20 productions, in a minority of which he also starred.

In his later years he had heart problems, which forced his temporary withdrawal from the theatre in 1957. He died of a heart attack in the south of France in 1962, at the age of 65. He was unmarried.

Early life 
Kendall was born in London in 1897, the son of William Kendall and his wife Rebecca, née Nathan. He was educated at the City of London School. He began his stage career "walking on" (as a non-speaking extra) in Tommy Atkins at the Lyceum Theatre in 1914. From then until he joined the armed forces during the First World War he was first a chorus member in Business as Usual at the Hippodrome Theatre (1914), then a supporting player in Watch Your Step (Empire Theatre, 1915); and for nine months a member of the Old Vic company, playing juvenile parts in Shakespeare repertory, including Claudio in Much Ado About Nothing, Florizel in The Winter's Tale, and Sebastian in Twelfth Night (1915–1916).

From 1916–1919 Kendall served as a captain in the Royal Flying Corps (latterly the Royal Air Force), winning the Air Force Cross.

Stage career from 1919

1919 to 1930
In the post-war decade Kendall played more than 30 roles in the West End and on Broadway:

1930 to 1945
In the 1930s and during the Second World War Kendall continued to appear mainly in the West End, but toured in three productions:

1945 to 1961

Film career 
Kendall dismissed his own films, several of which were quota quickies, with the remark that he "commenced film career 1931, and has appeared in innumerable pictures". He played the leading role of Reggie Ogden in the film The Shadow in 1933, and also starred in Alfred Hitchcock's "bravest failure", Rich and Strange, originally released in the United States as East of Shanghai, (1931). Kendall's films included:

 Mr. Pim Passes By (1921)
 Tilly of Bloomsbury (1921)
 French Leave (1930)
 The Flying Fool (1931)
 Rich and Strange (1931)
 Mr. Bill the Conqueror (1932)
 The Innocents of Chicago (1932)
 The Iron Stair (1933)
 The Man Outside (1933)
 The Ghost Camera (1933)
 The Stickpin (1933)
 Great Stuff (1933)
 The Shadow (1933)
 Counsel's Opinion (1933)
 King of the Ritz (1933)
 Timbuctoo (1933)
 This Week of Grace (1933)
 The Flaw (1933)
 The Girl in Possession (1934)
 Leave It to Blanche (1934)
 The Man I Want (1934)
 Crazy People (1934)

 Death at Broadcasting House (1934)
 Without You (1934)
 Death on the Set (1935)
 Lend Me Your Wife (1935)
 Three Witnesses (1935)
 The Amazing Quest of Ernest Bliss (1936)
 A Wife or Two (1936)
 Twelve Good Men (1936)
 School for Husbands (1937)
 Take a Chance (1937)
 Side Street Angel (1937)
 The Compulsory Wife (1937)
 Ship's Concert (1937)
 It's Not Cricket (1937)
 The Mysterious Mr. Davis (1939)
 The Butler's Dilemma (1943)
 29 Acacia Avenue (1945)
 Helter Skelter (1949)
 The Voice of Merrill (1952)
 An Alligator Named Daisy (1955)
 Shadow of the Cat (1961)
 Nothing Barred (1961)

Revue 
As a West End revue artiste Kendall appeared in Charlot's Revue at the Prince of Wales Theatre in 1924 and Charlot's Masquerade at the Cambridge Theatre in 1930. He co-starred with Hermione Gingold in the three long-running Sweet and Low revues, with scripts by Alan Melville, first taking over from Walter Crisham in 1944; this was followed in June 1948 by the À la Carte revue at the Savoy Theatre.

He appeared with Hermione Baddeley and Hermione Gingold ("The Two Hermiones"), Walter Crisham and Wilfred Hyde-White, in Leslie Julian Jones's revue Rise Above It, first at the Q Theatre in January 1941, when Hedley Briggs was nominally directing; then in two West End editions of the show which ran for a total of 380 performances at the Comedy Theatre opening in June 1941 and again in December 1941, when he was both starring in and directing the show.

He observed in his autobiography:

Director 
In addition to a busy career as an actor and entertainer Kendal was frequently engaged as a director, staging, among other plays, the first productions of See How They Run (Peterborough Rep, tour and Q Theatre 1944; Comedy Theatre 1945), and The Shop at Sly Corner (St Martin's Theatre 1945). He also directed numerous plays at the Embassy Theatre and Q Theatre. 

In Chapter 23 of his autobiography, 'I Remember Romano's', 'An Alligator and Mr. Chaplin', (Macdonald, London, 1960), Kendal wrote that Peter Daubeny asked him in 1955 to " ...keep an eye on, (produce), his revival at the Palace", (Palace Theatre, London), of The Merry Widow, starring Jan Kiepura and Marta Eggerth, while he was on business in Paris.

Among his productions were:

 A Lass and a Lackey, Q Theatre, December 1940
 Rise Above It (revue), Comedy Theatre, June 1941
 Other People's Houses, Ambassadors Theatre, October 1941
 Scoop (revue), Vaudeville Theatre, April 1942
 Man from Heaven, Q Theatre, September 1943
 This Was a Woman, Comedy Theatre, March 1944 – previously staged at the Q Theatre as The Dark Potential, January 1944
 Fly Away Peter, Q Theatre, September 1944
 See How They Run, Q Theatre, December 1944; Comedy Theatre, January 1945
 Great Day, Playhouse Theatre, March 1945
 The Shop at Sly Corner, St Martin's Theatre, April 1945
 Green Laughter, Q Theatre, August 1945; Comedy Theatre, June 1946

 Fit for Heroes, Embassy Theatre, September 1945; Whitehall, December 1945
 Macadam and Eve, Aldwych Theatre, March 1951
 The Nest Egg, Wimbledon Theatre, November 1952
 Where the Rainbow Ends, Stoll Theatre, December 1953
 Meet a Body, Duke of York's Theatre, July 1954
 Tropical Fever, Theatre Royal, Brighton, March 1955
 Ring for Catty, Lyric Theatre, February 1956
 You, Too, Can Have a Body, Victoria Palace, June 1958
 Watch It, Sailor! (in association with André Van Gyseghem, Aldwych Theatre, February 1960
 Bachelor Flat, Piccadilly Theatre, May 1960

Kendall's autobiography was published by MacDonald & Co in 1960; it was called I Remember Romanos.

In his later years Kendal suffered from heart trouble. He had to give up work for a while in 1957 after a heart attack. In February 1960 he was hospitalised after suffering another attack at his house in Hampstead. He had a final, fatal attack while staying at Le Rayol in the South of France, on 9 June 1962, at the age of 65. He was unmarried.

Notes, references and sources

Notes

References

Sources

External links 
 
 

1897 births
1962 deaths
English male stage actors
English theatre directors
English male film actors
People educated at the City of London School
20th-century English male actors
British Army personnel of World War I
Royal Flying Corps officers